Tania Rahman Tonni is a Bangladeshi model and beauty pageant titleholder who was crowned Miss Bangladesh 1999 and represented Bangladesh at Miss World 1999.

References

Bangladeshi beauty pageant winners
Bangladeshi female models
Living people
Miss World 1999 delegates
Year of birth missing (living people)